Uue-Kariste is a village in Mulgi Parish, Viljandi County, in southern Estonia. It has a population of 59 (as of 1 January 2000).

References

Villages in Viljandi County
Kreis Pernau